= HM15275 =

Legal status
- Legal status: Investigational (Phase 2 Clinical Trials)

Identifiers
- IUPAC name: 39-amino-acid synthetic peptide macro-molecule (No standard systematic small-molecule IUPAC name exists)
- CAS Number: 3050497-44-1
- DrugBank: HM15275

HM15275 is a next-generation investigational medication in clinical development for obesity and metabolic disorders, designed as a long-acting triple receptor agonist targeting GLP-1, GIP, and glucagon receptors. Developed by Hanmi Pharmaceutical, it aims for superior weight loss through concurrent activation of these receptors, optimizing glycemic control, appetite reduction, and enhanced energy expenditure. The tri-agonist strategy overcomes compensatory weight loss mechanisms and seeks to mimic hormonal interplay after nutrient intake. Its mechanism involves binding to G-protein coupled receptors to promote satiety, enhance insulin secretion, and increase energy expenditure. The integration of glucagon, previously limited by its hyperglycemic effects, is balanced with the other receptors to accelerate fat burning safely. This approach also preserves lean muscle mass during weight loss, ensuring better functional outcomes.
